The 2011 Asian Speed Skating Championships were held between 28 and 29 December 2010 at the Heilongjiang Indoor Rink in Harbin, China. The championships doubled as qualifier for the 2011 World Championships.

Women championships

Day 1

Day 2

Allround results

Men championships

Day 1

Day 2

Allround results

See also 
 Speed skating at the 2011 Asian Winter Games

References
speedskatingresults.com 

Asian Speed Skating Championships
Sport in Harbin
2011 in speed skating
International speed skating competitions hosted by China
Asian Speed Skating Championships